Temporena is a genus of air-breathing land snails, terrestrial pulmonate gastropod mollusks in the subfamily Hadrinae of the family Camaenidae.

Species
 Temporena juliafoxae Stanisic, 2010
 Temporena sardalabiata (Cox, 1871)
 Temporena whartoni (Cox, 1871)

References

External links
 Iredale, T. (1933). Systematic notes on Australian land shells. Records of the Australian Museum. 19(1): 37-59

 
Camaenidae